Sarah or Sara Foster may refer to:
Sarah Jane Foster, educator of newly-freed blacks in Martinsburg, West Virginia
Sara Foster (born 1981), American actress
Sara Foster (chef), American chef, cookbook author and restaurant owner
Sarah Foster (athlete), British athlete in the 2006 IAAF World Race Walking Cup
Sarah Foster (editor), editor of The Minnesota Review

See also
 Sarah Forster (born 1993), Swiss hockey player